Orchard Grass Hills is a home rule-class city in Oldham County, Kentucky, in the United States. The population was 1,595 at the 2010 census.

Geography
Orchard Grass Hills is located at  (38.324586, -85.524680).

Demographics

As of the census of 2000, there were 1,031 people, 330 households, and 279 families residing in the city. The racial makeup of the city was 94.08% White, 4.46% African American, 0.78% Asian, 0.58% from other races, and 0.10% from two or more races. Hispanic or Latino of any race were 1.36% of the population.

There were 330 households, out of which 51.8% had children under the age of 18 living with them; 70.9% were married couples living together; 10.0% had a female householder with no husband present; and 15.2% were non-families. 10.9% of all households were made up of individuals, and 0.6% had someone living alone who was 65 years of age or older. The average household size was 3.12 and the average family size was 3.39.

In the city, the population was spread out, with 35.0% under the age of 18, 6.5% from 18 to 24, 38.5% from 25 to 44, 18.6% from 45 to 64, and 1.4% who were 65 years of age or older. The median age was 30 years. For every 100 females, there were 100.6 males. For every 100 females age 18 and over, there were 98.8 males.

The median income for a household in the city was $63,824, and the median income for a family was $64,625. Males had a median income of $41,190 versus $26,836 for females. The per capita income for the city was $21,965. About 1.5% of families and 2.5% of the population were below the poverty line, including 2.3% of those under age 18 and 11.1% of those age 65 or over.

References

Cities in Oldham County, Kentucky
Cities in Kentucky
Louisville metropolitan area
Populated places established in 1979
1979 establishments in Kentucky